Ebonou (also spelled Obunu) is a town in southern Ivory Coast. It is a sub-prefecture of Grand-Lahou Department in Grands-Ponts Region, Lagunes District. It is about 1.5 kilometres (one mile) north of the coast.

Ebonou was a commune until March 2012, when it became one of 1126 communes nationwide that were abolished.

In 2014, the population of the sub-prefecture of Ebonou was 25,314.

Villages
The 14 villages of the sub-prefecture of Ebonou and their population in 2014 are:

References

Sub-prefectures of Grands-Ponts
Former communes of Ivory Coast